The Tarot Garden (Italian: Il Giardino dei Tarocchi, French: Le Jardin des Tarots) is a sculpture garden based on the esoteric tarot, created by the French-American artist Niki de Saint Phalle (1930–2002) in Pescia Fiorentina, località Garavicchio, in the municipality of Capalbio, province of Grosseto, Tuscany, Italy. The park was opened to the public in 1998.

Niki de Saint Phalle, inspired by Antoni Gaudí´s Parc Güell in Barcelona, and Parco dei Mostri in Bomarzo, as well as Palais Idéal by Ferdinand Cheval, and Watts Towers by Simon Rodia,  decided to make something similar in design for her monumental sculpture park based on the Tarot. There she built the Giardino dei Tarocchi, containing twenty-two monumental figures representing her idea of the greater Mysteries of the Tarot, constructed of reinforced concrete and covered with mirrors and ceramic mosaic. Some of the larger sculptural figures can be walked through; the artist herself lived inside the sphinx-like Empress for several years during the construction of the garden.

Selected publications
 Niki de Saint Phalle, Giulio Pietrocharchi: The Tarot Garden: The Tarot Garden. Benteli Zurich 1997, .
 Niki de Saint Phalle: The Tarot Garden: Giardino Del Tarrochi. Edizioni Charta, Milano 1997, .
 Carla Schulz Hoffman: Niki de Saint Phalle. Bilder-Figuren-Phantastische Garten. Prestel, Bonn 2008, .
 Philip Carr-Gomm: Sacred Places. Quercus Publishing, London 2008, .
 Jill Johnston, Marella Caracciolo Chia, Giulio Pietromarchi: Niki de Saint Phalle and The Tarot Garden. Benteli, Zurich 2010, .

References

External links
Official website
 The Magical world of Niki de Saint-Phalles Tarot Garden - Blog Post

Tarotology
Visionary environments
Sculpture gardens, trails and parks in Europe
Gardens in Tuscany
Arts in Italy